Eduardo dos Santos Haesler, commonly known as Dudu (born 10 February 1999), is a German professional footballer who plays as a goalkeeper for Werder Bremen.

Club career 
Haesler started his senior career with German Bundesliga side Werder Bremen. In 2021, he was sent on loan to FC Nordsjælland in Denmark. On 23 August 2021, he debuted for FC Nordsjælland during a 3–1 win over Vejle Boldklub.

International career 
Haesler is eligible to represent Brazil internationally through his mother.

References

External links 
 
 

Living people
1999 births
German people of Brazilian descent
Footballers from Duisburg
German footballers
Association football goalkeepers
Danish Superliga players
Regionalliga players
SV Werder Bremen players
SV Werder Bremen II players
FC Nordsjælland players
German expatriate footballers
German expatriate sportspeople in Denmark
Expatriate men's footballers in Denmark